A. Vellaisamy is an Indian politician and former Member of the Legislative Assembly of Tamil Nadu. He was elected to the Tamil Nadu legislative assembly as an Anna Dravida Munnetra Kazhagam candidate from Athoor constituency in 1977, and 1980 elections.
He has a son Sabrinath Vellaisamy and a daughter.

References 

All India Anna Dravida Munnetra Kazhagam politicians
Living people
Year of birth missing (living people)